The 86th United States Congress was a meeting of the legislative branch of the United States federal government, composed of the United States Senate and the United States House of Representatives. It met in Washington, D.C. from January 3, 1959, to January 3, 1961, during the last two years of the presidency of Dwight D. Eisenhower.

The apportionment of seats in the House of Representatives was based on the 1950 United States census until Alaska and Hawaii were admitted as states in 1959.  Then, the membership of the House temporarily increased to 437 (seating one member from each of those newly admitted states and leaving the apportionment of the other 435 seats unchanged); it would remain at 437 until reapportionment resulting from the 1960 census.

The Democrats maintained full control of Congress, with greatly increased majorities in both chambers.

Major events

 January 7, 1959: The United States recognizes the new Cuban government of Fidel Castro
 February 12, 1959: In commemorations of the 150th anniversary of Abraham Lincoln's birth, Congress met in joint session to hear actor Fredric March give a dramatic reading of the Gettysburg Address, followed with an address by writer Carl Sandburg
 February 1, 1960: Greensboro sit-ins begin
 May 1, 1960: U-2 incident
 June 29, 1960: King Bhumibol Adulyadej of Thailand addresses a Joint Meeting of Congress
 November 8, 1960: 1960 United States presidential election: John F. Kennedy elected

Major legislation

 1959: Airport Construction Act, 
 September 14, 1959: Landrum–Griffin Act, 
 April 22, 1960: Narcotics Manufacturing Act of 1960, 
 May 6, 1960: Civil Rights Act of 1960, 
 June 12, 1960: Multiple-Use Sustained-Yield Act of 1960, 
 July 14, 1960: Flood Control Act of 1960, 
 September 13, 1960: Social Security Amendments (Kerr-Mill aid),

Constitutional amendments 

 June 16, 1960: Approved an amendment to the United States Constitution extending the right to vote in the presidential election to citizens residing in the District of Columbia by granting the District electors in the Electoral College, as if it were a state, and submitted it to the state legislatures for ratification
 Amendment was later ratified on March 29, 1961, becoming the Twenty-third Amendment to the United States Constitution

Treaties 

 December 1, 1959: Antarctic Treaty signed
 January 19, 1960: Treaty of Mutual Cooperation and Security between the United States and Japan signed

States admitted 
 January 3, 1959: Alaska was admitted as the 49th state
August 21, 1959: Hawaii was admitted as the 50th state

Party summary

Senate

House of Representatives

Total members: 437. The increase over the usual 435 members was due to the admission of Alaska and Hawaii, whose seats were temporary until reapportionment following the 1960 Census.

Leadership

Senate 
 President: Richard Nixon (R)
 President pro tempore: Carl Hayden (D)

Majority (Democratic) leadership 
 Majority Leader: Lyndon B. Johnson
 Majority Whip: Mike Mansfield
 Caucus Secretary: Thomas C. Hennings Jr., until September 13, 1960
 George Smathers, afterwards

Minority (Republican) leadership 
 Minority Leader: Everett Dirksen
 Minority Whip: Thomas Kuchel
 Republican Conference Chairman: Leverett Saltonstall
 Republican Conference Secretary: Milton Young
 National Senatorial Committee Chair: Andrew Frank Schoeppel
 Policy Committee Chairman: Styles Bridges

House of Representatives 
 Speaker: Sam Rayburn (D)

Majority (Democratic) leadership 
 Majority Leader: John W. McCormack
 Majority Whip: Carl Albert
 Democratic Caucus Chairman: Melvin Price
 Democratic Caucus Secretary: Leonor Sullivan
 Democratic Campaign Committee Chairman: Michael J. Kirwan

Minority (Republican) leadership
 Minority Leader: Charles A. Halleck
 Minority Whip: Leslie C. Arends
 Republican Conference Chairman: Charles B. Hoeven
 Policy Committee Chairman: John W. Byrnes
 Republican Campaign Committee Chairman: Richard M. Simpson, until 1960
 William E. Miller, from 1960

Caucuses
 House Democratic Caucus
 Senate Democratic Caucus

Members

Senate
Senators are popularly elected statewide every two years, with one-third beginning new six-year terms with each Congress. Preceding the names in the list below are Senate class numbers, which indicate the cycle of their election, In this Congress, Class 2 meant their term ended with this Congress, requiring reelection in 1960; Class 3 meant their term began in the last Congress, requiring reelection in 1962; and Class 1 meant their term began in this Congress, requiring reelection in 1964.

Alabama
 2. John Sparkman (D)
 3. J. Lister Hill (D)

Alaska
 2. Bob Bartlett (D)
 3. Ernest Gruening (D)

Arizona
 1. Barry Goldwater (R)
 3. Carl Hayden (D)

Arkansas
 2. John L. McClellan (D)
 3. J. William Fulbright (D)

California
 1. Clair Engle (D)
 3. Thomas Kuchel (R)

Colorado
 2. Gordon Allott (R)
 3. John A. Carroll (D)

Connecticut
 1. Thomas J. Dodd (D)
 3. Prescott Bush (R)

Delaware
 1. John J. Williams (R)
 2. J. Allen Frear Jr. (D)

Florida
 1. Spessard Holland (D)
 3. George Smathers (D)

Georgia
 2. Richard Russell Jr. (D)
 3. Herman Talmadge (D)

Hawaii
 1. Hiram Fong (R), from August 21, 1959 (newly admitted state)
 3. Oren E. Long (D), from August 21, 1959 (newly admitted state)

Idaho
 2. Henry Dworshak (R)
 3. Frank Church (D)

Illinois
 2. Paul Douglas (D)
 3. Everett Dirksen (R)

Indiana
 1. Vance Hartke (D)
 3. Homer E. Capehart (R)

Iowa
 2. Thomas E. Martin (R)
 3. Bourke B. Hickenlooper (R)

Kansas
 2. Andrew Frank Schoeppel (R)
 3. Frank Carlson (R)

Kentucky
 2. John Sherman Cooper (R)
 3. Thruston Ballard Morton (R)

Louisiana
 2. Allen J. Ellender (D)
 3. Russell B. Long (D)

Maine
 1. Edmund Muskie (D)
 2. Margaret Chase Smith (R)

Maryland
 1. James Glenn Beall (R)
 3. John Marshall Butler (R)

Massachusetts
 1. John F. Kennedy (D), until December 22, 1960
 Benjamin A. Smith II (D), from December 27, 1960
 2. Leverett Saltonstall (R)

Michigan
 1. Philip Hart (D)
 2. Patrick V. McNamara (D)

Minnesota
 1. Eugene McCarthy (DFL)
 2. Hubert Humphrey (DFL)

Mississippi
 1. John C. Stennis (D)
 2. James Eastland (D)

Missouri
 1. Stuart Symington (D)
 3. Thomas C. Hennings Jr. (D), until September 13, 1960
 Edward V. Long (D), from September 23, 1960

Montana
 1. Mike Mansfield (D)
 2. James E. Murray (D)

Nebraska
 1. Roman Hruska (R)
 2. Carl Curtis (R)

Nevada
 1. Howard Cannon (D)
 3. Alan Bible (D)

New Hampshire
 2. Styles Bridges (R)
 3. Norris Cotton (R)

New Jersey
 1. Harrison A. Williams (D)
 2. Clifford P. Case (R)

New Mexico
 1. Dennis Chávez (D)
 2. Clinton Anderson (D)

New York
 1. Kenneth Keating (R)
 3. Jacob Javits (R)

North Carolina
 2. B. Everett Jordan (D)
 3. Sam Ervin (D)

North Dakota
 1. William Langer (R-NPL), until November 8, 1959
 Norman Brunsdale (R), November 19, 1959 – August 7, 1960
 Quentin Burdick (D-NPL), from August 8, 1960
 3. Milton Young (R)

Ohio
 1. Stephen M. Young (D)
 3. Frank Lausche (D)

Oklahoma
 2. Robert S. Kerr (D)
 3. Mike Monroney (D)

Oregon
 2. Richard L. Neuberger (D), until March 9, 1960
 Hall S. Lusk (D), March 16, 1960 – November 8, 1960
 Maurine Neuberger (D), from November 9, 1960
 3. Wayne Morse (D)

Pennsylvania
 1. Hugh Scott (R)
 3. Joseph S. Clark Jr. (D)

Rhode Island
 1. John Pastore (D)
 2. Theodore F. Green (D)

South Carolina
 2. Strom Thurmond (D)
 3. Olin D. Johnston (D)

South Dakota
 2. Karl E. Mundt (R)
 3. Francis H. Case (R)

Tennessee
 1. Albert Gore Sr. (D)
 2. Estes Kefauver (D)

Texas
 1. Ralph Yarborough (D)
 2. Lyndon B. Johnson (D)

Utah
 1. Frank Moss (D)
 3. Wallace F. Bennett (R)

Vermont
 1. Winston L. Prouty (R)
 3. George Aiken (R)

Virginia
 1. Harry F. Byrd (D)
 2. Absalom Willis Robertson (D)

Washington
 1. Henry M. Jackson (D)
 3. Warren Magnuson (D)

West Virginia
 1. Robert Byrd (D)
 2. Jennings Randolph (D)

Wisconsin
 1. William Proxmire (D)
 3. Alexander Wiley (R)

Wyoming
 1. Gale W. McGee (D)
 2. Joseph C. O'Mahoney (D)

House of Representatives
The names of members of the House of Representatives are preceded by their district numbers.

Alabama
 . Frank W. Boykin (D)
 . George M. Grant (D)
 . George W. Andrews (D)
 . Kenneth A. Roberts (D)
 . Albert Rains (D)
 . Armistead I. Selden Jr. (D)
 . Carl Elliott (D)
 . Robert E. Jones Jr. (D)
 . George Huddleston Jr. (D)

Alaska
 . Ralph Julian Rivers (D)

Arizona
 . John Jacob Rhodes (R)
 . Stewart Udall (D)

Arkansas
 . Ezekiel C. Gathings (D)
 . Wilbur Mills (D)
 . James William Trimble (D)
 . Oren Harris (D)
 . Dale Alford (D)
 . William F. Norrell (D)

California
 . Clement Woodnutt Miller (D)
 . Harold T. Johnson (D)
 . John E. Moss (D)
 . William S. Mailliard (R)
 . John F. Shelley (D)
 . John F. Baldwin Jr. (R)
 . Jeffery Cohelan (D)
 . George P. Miller (D)
 . J. Arthur Younger (R)
 . Charles Gubser (R)
 . John J. McFall (D)
 . B. F. Sisk (D)
 . Charles M. Teague (R)
 . Harlan Hagen (D)
 . Gordon L. McDonough (R)
 . Donald L. Jackson (R)
 . Cecil R. King (D)
 . Craig Hosmer (R)
 . Chester E. Holifield (D)
 . H. Allen Smith (R)
 . Edgar W. Hiestand (R)
 . Joseph F. Holt (R)
 . Clyde Doyle (D)
 . Glenard P. Lipscomb (R)
 . George A. Kasem (D)
 . James Roosevelt (D)
 . Harry R. Sheppard (D)
 . James B. Utt (R)
 . Dalip Singh Saund (D)
 . Bob Wilson (R)

Colorado
 . Byron G. Rogers (D)
 . Byron L. Johnson (D)
 . John Chenoweth (R)
 . Wayne N. Aspinall (D)

Connecticut
 . Emilio Q. Daddario (D)
 . Chester Bowles (D)
 . Robert Giaimo (D)
 . Donald J. Irwin (D)
 . John S. Monagan (D)
 . Frank Kowalski (D)

Delaware
 . Harris McDowell (D)

Florida
 . William C. Cramer (R)
 . Charles E. Bennett (D)
 . Bob Sikes (D)
 . Dante Fascell (D)
 . Syd Herlong (D)
 . Paul Rogers (D)
 . James A. Haley (D)
 . Donald Ray Matthews (D)

Georgia
 . Prince Hulon Preston Jr. (D)
 . J. L. Pilcher (D)
 . Tic Forrester (D)
 . John Flynt (D)
 . James C. Davis (D)
 . Carl Vinson (D)
 . Harlan Erwin Mitchell (D)
 . Iris Faircloth Blitch (D)
 . Phillip M. Landrum (D)
 . Paul Brown (D)

Hawaii
 . Daniel Inouye (D), from August 21, 1959 (newly admitted state)

Idaho
 . Gracie Pfost (D)
 . Hamer H. Budge (R)

Illinois
 . William L. Dawson (D)
 . Barratt O'Hara (D)
 . William T. Murphy (D)
 . Ed Derwinski (R)
 . John C. Kluczynski (D)
 . Thomas J. O'Brien (D)
 . Roland V. Libonati (D)
 . Dan Rostenkowski (D)
 . Sidney R. Yates (D)
 . Harold R. Collier (R)
 . Roman Pucinski (D)
 . Charles A. Boyle (D), until November 4, 1959
 . Marguerite S. Church (R)
 . Elmer J. Hoffman (R)
 . Noah M. Mason (R)
 . Leo E. Allen (R)
 . Leslie C. Arends (R)
 . Robert H. Michel (R)
 . Robert B. Chiperfield (R)
 . Edna O. Simpson (R)
 . Peter F. Mack Jr. (D)
 . William L. Springer (R)
 . George E. Shipley (D)
 . Melvin Price (D)
 . Kenneth J. Gray (D)

Indiana
 . Ray Madden (D)
 . Charles A. Halleck (R)
 . John Brademas (D)
 . E. Ross Adair (R)
 . J. Edward Roush (D)
 . Fred Wampler (D)
 . William G. Bray (R)
 . Winfield K. Denton (D)
 . Earl Hogan (D)
 . Randall S. Harmon (D)
 . Joseph W. Barr (D)

Iowa
 . Fred Schwengel (R)
 . Leonard G. Wolf (D)
 . H. R. Gross (R)
 . Steven V. Carter (D), until November 4, 1959
 John Henry Kyl (R), from December 15, 1959
 . Neal Edward Smith (D)
 . Merwin Coad (D)
 . Ben F. Jensen (R)
 . Charles B. Hoeven (R)

Kansas
 . William H. Avery (R)
 . Newell A. George (D)
 . Denver David Hargis (D)
 . Edward Herbert Rees (R)
 . James Floyd Breeding (D)
 . Wint Smith (R)

Kentucky
 . Frank Stubblefield (D)
 . William Natcher (D)
 . Frank W. Burke (D)
 . Frank Chelf (D)
 . Brent Spence (D)
 . John C. Watts (D)
 . Carl D. Perkins (D)
 . Eugene Siler (R)

Louisiana
 . F. Edward Hébert (D)
 . Hale Boggs (D)
 . Edwin E. Willis (D)
 . Overton Brooks (D)
 . Otto Passman (D)
 . James H. Morrison (D)
 . T. Ashton Thompson (D)
 . Harold B. McSween (D)

Maine
 . James C. Oliver (D)
 . Frank M. Coffin (D)
 . Clifford McIntire (R)

Maryland
 . Thomas F. Johnson (D)
 . Daniel Brewster (D)
 . Edward Garmatz (D)
 . George Hyde Fallon (D)
 . Richard Lankford (D)
 . John R. Foley (D)
 . Samuel Friedel (D)

Massachusetts
 . Silvio O. Conte (R)
 . Edward Boland (D)
 . Philip J. Philbin (D)
 . Harold Donohue (D)
 . Edith Nourse Rogers (R), until September 10, 1960
 . William H. Bates (R)
 . Thomas J. Lane (D)
 . Torbert Macdonald (D)
 . Hastings Keith (R)
 . Laurence Curtis (R)
 . Tip O'Neill (D)
 . John W. McCormack (D)
 . James A. Burke (D)
 . Joseph W. Martin Jr. (R)

Michigan
 . Thaddeus M. Machrowicz (D)
 . George Meader (R)
 . August E. Johansen (R)
 . Clare Hoffman (R)
 . Gerald Ford (R)
 . Charles E. Chamberlain (R)
 . James G. O'Hara (D)
 . Alvin Morell Bentley (R)
 . Robert P. Griffin (R)
 . Elford Albin Cederberg (R)
 . Victor A. Knox (R)
 . John B. Bennett (R)
 . Charles Diggs (D)
 . Louis C. Rabaut (D)
 . John Dingell (D)
 . John Lesinski Jr. (D)
 . Martha Griffiths (D)
 . William Broomfield (R)

Minnesota
 . Al Quie (R)
 . Ancher Nelsen (R)
 . Roy Wier (DFL)
 . Joseph Karth (DFL)
 . Walter Judd (R)
 . Fred Marshall (DFL)
 . Herman Carl Andersen (R)
 . John Blatnik (DFL)
 . Odin Langen (R)

Mississippi
 . Thomas Abernethy (D)
 . Jamie Whitten (D)
 . Frank Ellis Smith (D)
 . John Bell Williams (D)
 . W. Arthur Winstead (D)
 . William M. Colmer (D)

Missouri
 . Frank M. Karsten (D)
 . Thomas B. Curtis (R)
 . Leonor Sullivan (D)
 . George H. Christopher (D), until January 23, 1959
 William J. Randall (D), from March 3, 1959
 . Richard Walker Bolling (D)
 . William Raleigh Hull Jr. (D)
 . Charles Harrison Brown (D)
 . A. S. J. Carnahan (D)
 . Clarence Cannon (D)
 . Paul C. Jones (D)
 . Morgan M. Moulder (D)

Montana
 . Lee Metcalf (D)
 . LeRoy H. Anderson (D)

Nebraska
 . Phillip Hart Weaver (R)
 . Glenn Cunningham (R)
 . Lawrence Brock (D)
 . Donald McGinley (D)

Nevada
 . Walter S. Baring Jr. (D)

New Hampshire
 . Chester Earl Merrow (R)
 . Perkins Bass (R)

New Jersey
 . William T. Cahill (R)
 . Milton W. Glenn (R)
 . James C. Auchincloss (R)
 . Frank Thompson (D)
 . Peter Frelinghuysen Jr. (R)
 . Florence P. Dwyer (R)
 . William B. Widnall (R)
 . Gordon Canfield (R)
 . Frank C. Osmers Jr. (R)
 . Peter W. Rodino (D)
 . Hugh Joseph Addonizio (D)
 . George M. Wallhauser (R)
 . Cornelius Gallagher (D)
 . Dominick V. Daniels (D)

New Mexico
 . Thomas G. Morris (D)
 . Joseph Montoya (D)

New York
 . Stuyvesant Wainwright (R)
 . Steven Derounian (R)
 . Frank J. Becker (R)
 . Seymour Halpern (R)
 . Albert H. Bosch (R), until December 31, 1960
 . Lester Holtzman (D)
 . James J. Delaney (D)
 . Victor Anfuso (D)
 . Eugene James Keogh (D)
 . Edna F. Kelly (D)
 . Emanuel Celler (D)
 . Francis E. Dorn (R)
 . Abraham J. Multer (D)
 . John J. Rooney (D)
 . John H. Ray (R)
 . Adam Clayton Powell Jr. (D)
 . John Lindsay (R)
 . Alfred E. Santangelo (D)
 . Leonard Farbstein (D)
 . Ludwig Teller (D)
 . Herbert Zelenko (D)
 . James C. Healey (D)
 . Isidore Dollinger (D), until December 31, 1959
 Jacob H. Gilbert (D), from March 8, 1960
 . Charles A. Buckley (D)
 . Paul A. Fino (R)
 . Edwin B. Dooley (R)
 . Robert R. Barry (R)
 . Katharine St. George (R)
 . J. Ernest Wharton (R)
 . Leo W. O'Brien (D)
 . Dean P. Taylor (R)
 . Samuel S. Stratton (D)
 . Clarence E. Kilburn (R)
 . Alexander Pirnie (R)
 . R. Walter Riehlman (R)
 . John Taber (R)
 . Howard W. Robison (R)
 . Jessica M. Weis (R)
 . Harold C. Ostertag (R)
 . William E. Miller (R)
 . Thaddeus J. Dulski (D)
 . John R. Pillion (R)
 . Daniel A. Reed (R), until February 19, 1959
 Charles Goodell (R), from May 26, 1959

North Carolina
 . Herbert Covington Bonner (D)
 . Lawrence H. Fountain (D)
 . Graham Arthur Barden (D)
 . Harold D. Cooley (D)
 . Ralph James Scott (D)
 . Carl T. Durham (D)
 . Alton Lennon (D)
 . Alvin Paul Kitchin (D)
 . Hugh Quincy Alexander (D)
 . Charles R. Jonas (R)
 . Basil Lee Whitener (D)
 . David McKee Hall (D), until January 29, 1960
 Roy A. Taylor (D), from June 25, 1960

North Dakota
 . Quentin Burdick (D-NPL), until August 8, 1960
 . Don L. Short (R)

Ohio
 . Gordon H. Scherer (R)
 . William E. Hess (R)
 . Paul F. Schenck (R)
 . William Moore McCulloch (R)
 . Del Latta (R)
 . James G. Polk (D), until April 28, 1959
 Ward Miller (R), from November 8, 1960
 . Clarence J. Brown (R)
 . Jackson Edward Betts (R)
 . Thomas L. Ashley (D)
 . Walter H. Moeller (D)
 . Robert E. Cook (D)
 . Samuel L. Devine (R)
 . Albert David Baumhart Jr. (R)
 . William Hanes Ayres (R)
 . John E. Henderson (R)
 . Frank T. Bow (R)
 . Robert W. Levering (D)
 . Wayne Hays (D)
 . Michael J. Kirwan (D)
 . Michael A. Feighan (D)
 . Charles Vanik (D)
 . Frances P. Bolton (R)
 . William Edwin Minshall Jr. (R)

Oklahoma
 . Page Belcher (R)
 . Ed Edmondson (D)
 . Carl Albert (D)
 . Tom Steed (D)
 . John Jarman (D)
 . Toby Morris (D)

Oregon
 . A. Walter Norblad (R)
 . Al Ullman (D)
 . Edith Green (D)
 . Charles O. Porter (D)

Pennsylvania
 . William A. Barrett (D)
 . Kathryn E. Granahan (D)
 . James A. Byrne (D)
 . Robert N. C. Nix Sr. (D)
 . William J. Green Jr. (D)
 . Herman Toll (D)
 . William H. Milliken Jr. (R)
 . Willard S. Curtin (R)
 . Paul B. Dague (R)
 . Stanley A. Prokop (D)
 . Dan Flood (D)
 . Ivor D. Fenton (R)
 . John A. Lafore Jr. (R)
 . George M. Rhodes (D)
 . Francis E. Walter (D)
 . Walter M. Mumma (R)
 . Alvin Bush (R), until November 5, 1959
 Herman T. Schneebeli (R), from April 26, 1960
 . Richard M. Simpson (R), until January 7, 1960
 Douglas Hemphill Elliott (R), April 26, 1960 – June 19, 1960
 J. Irving Whalley (R), from November 8, 1960
 . James M. Quigley (D)
 . James E. Van Zandt (R)
 . John Herman Dent (D)
 . John P. Saylor (R)
 . Leon H. Gavin (R)
 . Carroll D. Kearns (R)
 . Frank M. Clark (D)
 . Thomas E. Morgan (D)
 . James G. Fulton (R)
 . William S. Moorhead (D)
 . Robert J. Corbett (R)
 . Elmer J. Holland (D)

Rhode Island
 . Aime Forand (D)
 . John E. Fogarty (D)

South Carolina
 . L. Mendel Rivers (D)
 . John J. Riley (D)
 . William Jennings Bryan Dorn (D)
 . Robert T. Ashmore (D)
 . Robert W. Hemphill (D)
 . John L. McMillan (D)

South Dakota
 . George McGovern (D)
 . Ellis Yarnal Berry (R)

Tennessee
 . B. Carroll Reece (R)
 . Howard Baker Sr. (R)
 . James B. Frazier Jr. (D)
 . Joe L. Evins (D)
 . Joseph Carlton Loser (D)
 . Ross Bass (D)
 . Tom J. Murray (D)
 . Fats Everett (D)
 . Clifford Davis (D)

Texas
 . Wright Patman (D)
 . Jack Brooks (D)
 . Lindley Beckworth (D)
 . Sam Rayburn (D)
 . Bruce Alger (R)
 . Olin E. Teague (D)
 . John Dowdy (D)
 . Albert Thomas (D)
 . Clark W. Thompson (D)
 . Homer Thornberry (D)
 . William R. Poage (D)
 . Jim Wright (D)
 . Frank N. Ikard (D)
 . John Andrew Young (D)
 . Joe M. Kilgore (D)
 . J. T. Rutherford (D)
 . Omar Burleson (D)
 . Walter E. Rogers (D)
 . George H. Mahon (D)
 . Paul J. Kilday (D)
 . O. C. Fisher (D)
 . Robert R. Casey (D)

Utah
 . Henry Aldous Dixon (R)
 . David S. King (D)

Vermont
 . William H. Meyer (D)

Virginia
 . Thomas N. Downing (D)
 . Porter Hardy Jr. (D)
 . J. Vaughan Gary (D)
 . Watkins Moorman Abbitt (D)
 . William M. Tuck (D)
 . Richard Harding Poff (R)
 . Burr P. Harrison (D)
 . Howard W. Smith (D)
 . W. Pat Jennings (D)
 . Joel Broyhill (R)

Washington
 . Thomas Pelly (R)
 . Jack Westland (R)
 . Russell V. Mack (R), until March 28, 1960
 Julia Butler Hansen (D), from November 8, 1960
 . Catherine Dean May (R)
 . Walt Horan (R)
 . Thor C. Tollefson (R)
 . Donald H. Magnuson (D)

West Virginia
 . Arch A. Moore Jr. (R)
 . Harley Orrin Staggers (D)
 . Cleveland M. Bailey (D)
 . Ken Hechler (D)
 . Elizabeth Kee (D)
 . John M. Slack Jr. (D)

Wisconsin
 . Gerald T. Flynn (D)
 . Robert Kastenmeier (D)
 . Gardner R. Withrow (R)
 . Clement J. Zablocki (D)
 . Henry S. Reuss (D)
 . William Van Pelt (R)
 . Melvin Laird (R)
 . John W. Byrnes (R)
 . Lester Johnson (D)
 . Alvin O'Konski (R)

Wyoming
 . Edwin Keith Thomson (R), until December 9, 1960

Non-voting members
 . John A. Burns (D), until August 21, 1959
 . Antonio Fernós-Isern (PPD)

Changes in membership

Senate

|-
| Hawaii(1)
| rowspan=2 | New seats
| rowspan=2 | Hawaii achieved statehood August 21, 1959.
| nowrap  | Hiram Fong (R)
| rowspan=2 | August 21, 1959

|-
| Hawaii(3)
| nowrap  | Oren E. Long (D)

|-
| North Dakota(1)
| nowrap  | William Langer (R)
| Died November 8, 1959.
| nowrap  | Norman Brunsdale (R)
| November 19, 1959

|-
| Oregon(2)
| nowrap  | Richard L. Neuberger (D)
| Died March 9, 1960
| nowrap  | Hall S. Lusk (D)
| March 16, 1960

|-
| North Dakota(1)
| nowrap  | Norman Brunsdale (R)
| Successor elected June 28, 1960.Successor qualified August 8, 1960.
| nowrap  | Quentin Burdick (D)
| August 8, 1960

|-
| Missouri(3)
| nowrap  | Thomas C. Hennings Jr. (D)
| Died September 13, 1960
| nowrap  | Edward V. Long (D)
| September 23, 1960

|-
| Oregon(2)
| nowrap  | Hall S. Lusk (D)
| Successor elected November 8, 1960
| nowrap  | Maurine Neuberger (D)
| November 9, 1960

|-
| Massachusetts(1)
| nowrap  | John F. Kennedy (D)
| Resigned December 22, 1960, after being elected President of the United States
| nowrap  | Benjamin A. Smith II (D)
| December 27, 1960
|}

House of Representatives

|-
| 
|  nowrap| George H. Christopher (D)
| style="font-size:80%" | Died January 23, 1959
|  nowrap | William J. Randall (D)
| March 3, 1959
|-
| 
|  nowrap| Daniel A. Reed (R)
| style="font-size:80%" | Died February 19, 1959
|  nowrap | Charles Goodell (R)
| May 26, 1959
|-
| 
|  nowrap| James G. Polk (D)
| style="font-size:80%" | Died April 28, 1959
|  nowrap | Ward Miller (R)
| November 8, 1960
|-
| 
|  nowrap| John A. Burns (D)
| style="font-size:80%" | Hawaii achieved statehood.
| colspan=2 | Seat eliminated August 21, 1959
|-
| 
| New seat
| style="font-size:80%" | Hawaii achieved statehood August 21, 1959
|  nowrap | Daniel Inouye (D)
| August 21, 1959
|-
| 
|  nowrap| Charles A. Boyle (D)
| style="font-size:80%" | Died November 4, 1959
| Vacant
| Not filled this term
|-
| 
|  nowrap| Steven V. Carter (D)
| style="font-size:80%" | Died November 4, 1959
|  nowrap | John Henry Kyl (R)
| December 15, 1959
|-
| 
|  nowrap| Alvin Bush (R)
| style="font-size:80%" | Died November 5, 1959
|  nowrap | Herman T. Schneebeli (R)
| April 26, 1960
|-
| 
|  nowrap| Isidore Dollinger (D)
| style="font-size:80%" | Resigned December 31, 1959
|  nowrap | Jacob H. Gilbert (D)
| March 8, 1960
|-
| 
|  nowrap| Richard M. Simpson (R)
| style="font-size:80%" | Died January 7, 1960
|  nowrap | Douglas Hemphill Elliott (R)
| April 26, 1960
|-
| 
|  nowrap| David McKee Hall (D)
| style="font-size:80%" | Died January 29, 1960
|  nowrap | Roy A. Taylor (D)
| June 25, 1960
|-
| 
|  nowrap| Russell V. Mack (R)
| style="font-size:80%" | Died March 28, 1960
|  nowrap | Julia Butler Hansen (D)
| November 8, 1960
|-
| 
|  nowrap| Douglas Hemphill Elliott (R)
| style="font-size:80%" | Died June 19, 1960
|  nowrap | J. Irving Whalley (R)
| November 8, 1960
|-
| 
|  nowrap| Quentin Burdick (D)
| style="font-size:80%" | Resigned August 8, 1960, after becoming U.S. Senator
| rowspan=4 |Vacant
| rowspan=4 |Not filled this term
|-
| 
|  nowrap| Edith Nourse Rogers (R)
| style="font-size:80%" | Died September 10, 1960
|-
| 
|  nowrap| Edwin Keith Thomson (R)
| style="font-size:80%" | Died December 9, 1960
|-
| 
|  nowrap| Albert H. Bosch (R)
| style="font-size:80%" | Resigned December 31, 1960, after being elected judge of Court of Queens County
|}

Committees

Senate

 Aeronautical and Space Sciences (Chairman: Lyndon B. Johnson; Ranking Member: Styles Bridges)
 Agriculture and Forestry (Chairman: Allen J. Ellender; Ranking Member: George D. Aiken)
 Appropriations (Chairman: Carl Hayden; Ranking Member: Styles Bridges)
 Armed Services (Chairman: Richard B. Russell; Ranking Member: Leverett Saltonstall)
 Banking and Currency (Chairman: A. Willis Robertson; Ranking Member: Homer Capehart)
 District of Columbia (Chairman: Alan Bible; Ranking Member: J. Glenn Beall)
 Finance (Chairman: Harry F. Byrd; Ranking Member: John J. Williams)
 Foreign Relations (Chairman: J. William Fulbright; Ranking Member: Alexander Wiley)
 Government Operations (Chairman: John Little McClellan; Ranking Member: Karl E. Mundt)
 Interior and Insular Affairs (Chairman: James E. Murray; Ranking Member: Henry Dworshak)
 Interstate and Foreign Commerce (Chairman: Warren G. Magnuson; Ranking Member: Andrew F. Schoeppel)
 Judiciary (Chairman: Warren G. Magnuson; Ranking Member: Alexander Wiley) 
 Labor-Management Relations (Select) ()
 Labor and Public Welfare (Chairman: J. Lister Hill; Ranking Member: Barry Goldwater)
 National Water Resources (Select)
 Preserve Historical Records of the Senate (Special)
 Post Office and Civil Service (Chairman: Olin D. Johnston; Ranking Member: Frank Carlson)
 Public Works (Chairman: Dennis Chavez; Ranking Member: Francis Case)
 Rules and Administration (Chairman: Thomas C. Hennings; Ranking Member: Carl T. Curtis)
 Small Business (Select) (Chairman: John J. Sparkman)
 Space and Aeronautics (Special)
 Unemployment Problems (Special)
 Whole

House of Representatives

 Agriculture (Chairman: Harold D. Cooley; Ranking Member: Charles B. Hoeven)
 Appropriations (Chairman: Clarence Cannon; Ranking Member: John Taber)
 Armed Services (Chairman: Carl Vinson; Ranking Member: Leslie C. Arends)
 Banking and Currency (Chairman: Brent Spence; Ranking Member: Clarence E. Kilburn)
 District of Columbia (Chairman: John L. McMillan; Ranking Member: James C. Auchincloss)
 Education and Labor (Chairman: Graham A. Barden; Ranking Member: Carroll D. Kearns) 
 Foreign Affairs (Chairman: Thomas E. Morgan; Ranking Member: Robert B. Chiperfield)
 Government Operations (Chairman: William L. Dawson; Ranking Member: Clare E. Hoffman)
 House Administration (Chairman: Omar Burleson; Ranking Member: Paul F. Schenck)
 Interior and Insular Affairs (Chairman: Wayne N. Aspinall; Ranking Member: John P. Saylor)
 Interstate and Foreign Commerce (Chairman: Oren Harris; Ranking Member: John B. Bennett)
Subcommittee on Legislative Oversight 
 Judiciary (Chairman: Emanuel Celler; Ranking Member: William M. McCulloch)
 Merchant Marine and Fisheries (Chairman: Herbert C. Bonner; Ranking Member: Thor C. Tollefson)
 Post Office and Civil Service (Chairman: Tom J. Murray; Ranking Member: Edward H. Rees)
 Public Works (Chairman: Charles A. Buckley; Ranking Member: James C. Auchincloss)
 Rules (Chairman: Howard W. Smith; Ranking Member: Leo E. Allen)
 Science and Astronautics (Chairman: Overton Brooks; Ranking Member: Joseph W. Martin Jr.)
 Small Business (Select) (Chairman: Wright Patman)
 Standards of Official Conduct
 Un-American Activities (Chairman: Francis E. Walter; Ranking Member: Donald L. Jackson)
 Veterans' Affairs (Chairman: Olin E. Teague; Ranking Member: Edith Nourse Rogers)
 Ways and Means (Chairman: Wilbur D. Mills; Ranking Member: Richard M. Simpson)
 Whole

Joint committees

 Atomic Energy (Chairman: Sen. Clinton P. Anderson; Vice Chairman: Rep. Carl T. Durham)
 Conditions of Indian Tribes (Special)
 Construction of a Building for a Museum of History and Technology for the Smithsonian
 Defense Production (Chairman: Rep. Paul Brown; Vice Chairman: Sen. Homer Capehart)
 Disposition of Executive Papers
 Economic
 Immigration and Nationality Policy (Chairman: Vacant; Vice Chairman: Vacant)
 Legislative Budget
 The Library (Chairman: Sen. Theodore F. Green; Vice Chairman: Rep. Omar Burleson)
 Navajo-Hopi Indian Administration
 Printing (Chairman: Sen. Carl Hayden; Vice Chairman: Rep. Omar Burleson)
 Reduction of Nonessential Federal Expenditures (Chairman: Sen. Harry F. Byrd; Vice Chairman: Rep. Clarence Cannon)
 Taxation (Chairman: Rep. Wilbur D. Mills; Vice Chairman: Sen. Harry F. Byrd)
 Washington (DC) Metropolitan Problems

Employees

Legislative branch agency directors
 Architect of the Capitol: J. George Stewart
 Attending Physician of the United States Congress: George Calver
 Comptroller General of the United States: Joseph Campbell 
 Librarian of Congress: Lawrence Quincy Mumford 
 Public Printer of the United States: Raymond Blattenberger

Senate
 Chaplain: Frederick Brown Harris, Methodist
 Parliamentarian: Charles Watkins
 Secretary: Felton McLellan Johnston
 Librarian: Richard D. Hupman
 Secretary for the Majority: Robert G. Baker
 Secretary for the Minority: J. Mark Trice
 Sergeant at Arms: Joseph C. Duke

House of Representatives
 Clerk: Ralph R. Roberts
 Doorkeeper: William Mosley "Fishbait" Miller
 Parliamentarian: Lewis Deschler
 Postmaster: H. H. Morris
 Reading Clerks: George J. Maurer (D) and Joe Bartlett (R) 
 Sergeant at Arms: Zeake W. Johnson Jr.
 Chaplain: Bernard Braskamp - Presbyterian

See also
 1958 United States elections (elections leading to this Congress)
 1958 United States Senate elections
 1958 United States House of Representatives elections
 1960 United States elections (elections during this Congress, leading to the next Congress)
 1960 United States presidential election
 1960 United States Senate elections
 1960 United States House of Representatives elections

Notes

References

Specific citations

General references